The University of Science and Technology of Southern Philippines – Claveria Campus (USTP Claveria), formerly Misamis Oriental State College of Agriculture and Technology (MOSCAT) is a public institution of tertiary education.

In 2016, MOSCAT was amalgamated with the Mindanao University of Science and Technology to establish the University of Science and Technology of Southern Philippines.

Profile

History

MOSCAT started as Claveria Municipal High School in 1963 with 165 students and five teachers under the leadership of its first administrator, the late Romeo Abilo. In 1967, it was converted to Claveria National Rural High School (CNRHS) by virtue of RA 3781 under the staunch leadership of the late Marcos Edrolin. On June 10, 1983, Batas Pambansa 402 was approved and converted the CNRHS to Misamis Oriental State College of Agriculture and Technology or MOSCAT with Arsenio B. Gonzales as its first president. Gonzales’ term was highlighted by the Republic of The Philippines-European Union Agricultural Education Grant providing more facilities and machinery, vehicles, buildings and faculty training locally and abroad. During his period, the notable Model Farm was established showcasing sustainable upland farming technologies.

In 1996, Dr. Teresita T. Tumapon was appointed as officer-in-charge. She strengthened local and international linkages such as Barangay Integrated Approached for Nutrition Improvement (BIDANI), the Agroforestry Support Program for Empowering Communities Towards Self-reliance in Sustainable Development of the Uplands and the International Center for Research in Agroforestry.

Dr. Juan A. Nagtalon became its second president from 1998 until 2006.

On July 21, 2016, Republic Act No. 10919 established the University of Science and Technology of Southern Philippines (USTSP) that amalgamated the Mindanao University of Science and Technology (MUST) and Misamis Oriental State College of Agriculture and Technology (MOSCAT) transferring its main campus to the 292 hectares in Alubijid, Misamis Oriental.

School administrators

Campus

MOSCAT is located in the upland farming community of Claveria, one of the 24 towns comprising the province of Misamis Oriental. It is 600m above sea level and overlooks Macajalar and Gingoog bays.  The college has 65 hectares for its main campus and 32 hectares for its field laboratories and production enterprises.

Academic programs

Graduate programs
Doctor of Philosophy in Crop Science and
Doctor of Philosophy in Animal Science
Master of Science in Agriculture, major in Crop Science and Animal Science

Baccalaureate programs

Institute of Engineering and Technology
Bachelor of Science in Agricultural and Biosystems Engineering (BSABE)
Bachelor of Science in Environmental Engineering (BSEnE)
Bachelor in Food Technology (BFT)

Institute of Arts and Sciences

Institute of Agriculture
Bachelor of Agricultural Technology (BAT) major in:
Crop Production
Animal Production
Farm Mechanization
Post-harvest Processing
Bachelor of Science in Agriculture (BSA) major in:
Crop Science
Animal Science
Entrepreneurship
Dairy Science
Agricultural Education
Bachelor of Technology in Horticulture Management (BTHM)
Bachelor of Science in Agro-Forestry (BSAF)

Diploma courses

Diploma in Information Technology (DIT)
Diploma in Agro-Forestry Technology (DAFT)
Diploma in Agricultural Technology (DAT)
Short-Term Course in Computer
Short-Term Course in Dairy Farm Management
Short-Term Course in Rubber Technology

High school

MOSCAT - Laboratory High School adopts the science and technology curriculum.

Accreditation

Accreditation of academic programs have been conducted by the Accrediting Agency of Chartered Colleges and Universities in the Philippines (AACCUP). Some programs reach level II accreditation.

See also
 MASCUF

References

State universities and colleges in the Philippines
Mindanao Association State Colleges and Universities Foundation
Universities and colleges in Misamis Oriental
Philippine Association of State Universities and Colleges